Dwaine O. Cowan (25 November 1935 – 5 May 2006) was an American chemist. He was a professor of chemistry at Johns Hopkins University.  He is best known for his pioneering work in the field of organic conductors.  His other research interests included organometallic chemistry, organic photochemistry, organic chemistry, metallocenes and the synthesis of heterocyclic compounds containing sulfur, selenium, and tellurium.

Education 
He received a B.S. in chemistry from Fresno State College in 1958 and a Ph.D. in chemistry from Harry Stone Mosher at Stanford University in 1962.

Research
Cowan was one of the dominant, world-renowned figures in physical organic chemistry during his thirty-year career. He is considered to be the father of "organic conductors and superconductors", a burgeoning area of science and technology that cuts across the disciplines of chemistry, physics and materials science.

Cowan was invited to contribute a special report titled "The Organic Solid State" on the subject of organic conductors to Chemical and Engineering News (July 21, 1986).

Cowan and his students have authored 190 scientific articles, four patents and two monographs. He co-authored a book with Ronald Drisko entitled Elements of Organic Photochemistry.

Personal life
He was preceded in death by his wife, LaVon "Bonnie" Adams Cowan; and his parents Oliver and EvaBelle Cowan.

Awards
He received a number of major awards including Alfred P. Sloan Foundation Fellowship (1968-1970), Guggenheim Fellowship, University of Basel, Switzerland (1970-1971), elected Fellow of the American Association for the Advancement of Science (1989) and the Alexander von Humboldt Senior Scientist for the University of Heidelberg, Germany (1992- 1993).

References

1935 births
2006 deaths
20th-century American chemists
California State University, Fresno alumni
Johns Hopkins University faculty
Stanford University alumni
Superconductivity scientists and engineers